The 26th CARIFTA Games was held at the National Stadium in Bridgetown, Barbados, on April 4–6, 1997.

Participation (unofficial)

Detailed result lists can be found on the "World Junior Athletics History" website.  An unofficial count yields the number of about 270 athletes (146 junior (under-20) and 124 youth (under-17)) from about 19 countries:  Antigua and Barbuda (8), Aruba (1), Bahamas (27), Barbados (41), Bermuda (11), British Virgin Islands (2), Cayman Islands (5), Dominica (6), Grenada (10), Guadeloupe (16), Guyana (11), Jamaica (53), Martinique (30), Saint Kitts and Nevis (3), Saint Lucia (3), Saint Vincent and the Grenadines (7), Suriname (1), Trinidad and Tobago (29), US Virgin Islands (7).

Austin Sealy Award

The Austin Sealy Trophy for the most outstanding athlete of the games was awarded for the first time jointly to two athletes: Aleen Bailey and Roy Bailey, both from Jamaica.  Aleen Bailey won a gold (200m) and a silver medal (100m), while Roy Bailey won 3 gold medals (100m, 200m, and 4 × 100m relay).  Both athletes competed in the junior (U-20) category.

Medal summary
Medal winners are published by category: Boys under 20 (Junior), Girls under 20 (Junior), Boys under 17 (Youth), and Girls under 17 (Youth).
Complete results can be found on the "World Junior Athletics History" website.

Boys under 20 (Junior)

Girls under 20 (Junior)

Boys under 17 (Youth)

Girls under 17 (Youth)

Medal table (unofficial)

References

External links
World Junior Athletics History

CARIFTA Games
1997 in Barbadian sport
CARIFTA
1997 in Caribbean sport
International athletics competitions hosted by Barbados